Célia Bertin (22 October 1920 – 27 November 2014) was a French writer, journalist, biographer, French Resistance fighter and winner of the 1953 Prix Renaudot. She was awarded as an Officer of the Legion of Honour, and an Officer of Ordre des Arts et des Lettres.

Biography 
After her secondary education at the Lycée Fénelon, she obtained a degree in literature at the Sorbonne. She wrote a thesis on the influence of the Russian novel (Gogol, Turgenev, Dostoevsky, Tolstoy, Chekhov) on the contemporary English novel (Arnold Bennett to Virginia Woolf).

During World War II, she joined the Resistance, and in 1944 she was sent by the Ministry of Information to Switzerland. After the war, she lived in Cagnes-sur-Mer, and Saint-Paul-de-Vence. She published her first novel, The Parade of the wicked, in 1946.

She moved to Paris in 1953, when she won the Prix Renaudot for The Last Innocence.

She translated articles from English and Italian to French and published numerous articles (in Le Figaro Literature, Arts, and La Revue de Paris).

In 1967, Celia Bertin was invited to be a writer-in-residence at Tufts University in Boston, where she wrote a novel in French titled Je t'appellerai Amérique ["I'll call you, America"] (1972, Editions Grasset). She later married Jerry Reich of New York City and the couple lived in Boston, New Hampshire, Maine and Paris. Jerry Reich, an advertising executive, died in 2010. Bertin died on 27 November 2014, aged 94.

Works
 1946: La Parade des impies, Paris, Grasset
 1947: La Bague était brisée, Paris, Corrêa
 1949: Les Saisons du mélèze, Paris, Corrêa
 1953: La Dernière innocence, 1953, Prix Renaudot. English translation by Marjorie Deans, The Last Innocence, New York, McGraw-Hill Book Co., 1955
 1954: Contre-champ: roman, Paris, Plon
 1957: Une femme heureuse: roman, Paris, Corrêa
 1958: Le Temps des femmes, Paris, Hachette
 1963: La Comédienne, Paris, Grasset
 1967: Mayerling, ou le destin fatal des Wittelsbach, Paris, Perrin 
 1972: Je t'appellerai Amérique, Paris, B. Grasset
 1977: Liens de famille, Paris, B. Grasset 
 1982: Marie Bonaparte, a life, New York, Harcourt Brace Jovanovich 
 1991: Jean Renoir, a Life in Pictures, Baltimore: Johns Hopkins University Press 
 1994: Femmes sous l'Occupation, Paris, Stock
 1994: Jean Renoir, cinéaste, Paris, Gallimard, coll. "Découvertes Gallimard" nº 209; reissue: Gallimard, 2005, 
 1999: Marie Bonaparte, la dernière Bonaparte, Paris, Perrin: présentation de Elisabeth Roudinesco
 1999: Louise Weiss, Paris, Albin Michel 
 2005: Femmes sous l'Occupation, Paris, Les Éditions de la Seine 
 2008: Portrait d'une femme romanesque: Jean Voilier, Paris, Éditions de Fallois 
2009: La Femme à Vienne au temps de Freud, Paris, Tallandier

References

External links
"Célia Bertin", French wikipedia

1920 births
Writers from Paris
20th-century French novelists
21st-century French novelists
French Resistance members
Prix Renaudot winners
Officiers of the Légion d'honneur
2014 deaths